Luis Gámir Casares (8 May 1942 – 15 January 2017) was a Spanish politician.

References

1942 births
2017 deaths
Politicians from Madrid
Complutense University of Madrid alumni
Members of the constituent Congress of Deputies (Spain)
Members of the 1st Congress of Deputies (Spain)
Members of the 5th Congress of Deputies (Spain)
Members of the 6th Congress of Deputies (Spain)
Members of the 7th Congress of Deputies (Spain)
Members of the 8th Congress of Deputies (Spain)
People's Party (Spain) politicians
Union of the Democratic Centre (Spain) politicians
Spanish economists